The 2021 Judo Grand Slam Tashkent was held at the Humo Ice Dome in Tashkent, Uzbekistan from 5 to 7 March 2021.

Medal summary

Medal table

Men's events

Source Results

Women's events

Source Results

Event videos
The event was air freely on the IJF YouTube channel.

References

External links
 

2021 IJF World Tour
2021 Judo Grand Slam
Judo
Judo
Sport in Tashkent